Cameron Ellis Lynch (born August 4, 1993) is a former American football linebacker. He played college football at Syracuse. He signed with the St. Louis Rams as an undrafted free agent in 2015.

College career
Lynch played college football for the Syracuse Orange and graduated in 2015 with a bachelor’s degree in economics. In his senior year, he led the Orange and was ranked the No. 40 outside linebacker among 2015 NFL Draft prospects by CBSSports.com.

Professional career

St. Louis / Los Angeles Rams
After going undrafted in the 2015 NFL Draft, Lynch signed with the St. Louis Rams on May 8, 2015.

On September 3, 2016, Lynch was waived by the Rams as part of final roster cuts.

Tampa Bay Buccaneers
On September 13, 2016, Lynch was signed to the Tampa Bay Buccaneers' practice squad. He was promoted to the active roster on October 9, 2016.

On September 17, 2017, in Week 2 against the Chicago Bears, Lynch recovered a fumble to help set up the Buccaneers on eventual touchdown scoring drive. He was waived by the Buccaneers on December 2, 2017.

Los Angeles Rams (second stint)
On December 6, 2017, Lynch was signed to the Los Angeles Rams' practice squad, and was promoted to the active roster three days later.

Tampa Bay Buccaneers (second stint)
On March 16, 2018, Lynch signed with the Buccaneers. He received multiple Bucs community MVP awards.

Broadcasting career
Lynch had aspired to become a sports broadcaster and media personality during his college years. He began his broadcasting career at Syracuse when started a weekly Cuse.com feature named "Cam's Cam.", where he interviewed his teammates. He joined the USC Annenberg School for Communication and Journalism after his NFL career.

Lynch has worked with the NFL Network, Fox Sports and was even selected to broadcast 2019 Superbowl. In 2019, he was named the interim co-host on an NBC daytime show.

In 2021, Lynch served as in-stadium broadcaster for Super Bowl LV, along with Scott Hanson.

References

External links
Syracuse Orange bio
Los Angeles Rams bio
Lynch on 'Cuse Conversations Podcast in 2020

1993 births
Living people
People from Lawrenceville, Georgia
African-American sports announcers
American football linebackers
Los Angeles Rams players
Players of American football from Georgia (U.S. state)
National Football League announcers
Sportspeople from the Atlanta metropolitan area
St. Louis Rams players
Syracuse Orange football players
Tampa Bay Buccaneers players
USC Annenberg School for Communication and Journalism alumni